Plattenhardt is a former municipality in the Esslingen district, in Baden-Württemberg, Germany. It was first recorded in year 1269 as Blatinhart.

In 1975 it was merged with the municipalities Bernhausen, Bonlanden, Sielmingen and Harthausen to form the new town Filderstadt. Plattenhardt is today a quarter of Filderstadt, formally named Filderstadt-Plattenhardt. It has 8,482 inhabitants and is located 27 km from Stuttgart.

Sources
Das Land Baden-Württemberg – Amtliche Beschreibung nach Kreisen und Gemeinden. Band III Regierungsbezirk Stuttgart, Region Mittlerer Neckar (ed. Landesarchivdirektion Baden-Württemberg). Kohlhammer Verlag: Stuttgart 1978 
 Nikolaus Back: Von Filderlinden nach Filderstadt. Die Gemeindereform von 1975. Stadt Filderstadt 2000 
 Der Landkreis Esslingen (ed. Landesarchiv Baden-Württemberg with the Landkreis Esslingen), Band I, p. 519. Jan Thorbecke Verlag: Ostfildern 2009. 

Villages in Baden-Württemberg
Former municipalities in Baden-Württemberg